The Catechism of the Catholic Church (commonly called the Catechism or the CCC) is a catechism promulgated for the Catholic Church by Pope John Paul II in 1992. It aims to summarize, in book form, the main beliefs of the Catholic Church.

Redaction 
The decision to publish an official catechism was taken at the Second Extraordinary General Assembly of the Synod of Bishops that was convened by Pope John Paul II on 25 January 1985, to evaluate the progress of implementing the Vatican II council's goals on the 20th anniversary of its closure. The assembly participants expressed the desire that "a catechism or compendium of all Catholic doctrine regarding both faith and morals be composed, that it might be, as it were, a point of reference for the catechisms or compendiums that are prepared in various regions. The presentation of doctrine must be biblical and liturgical. It must be sound doctrine suited to the present life of Christians."

John Paul II says that in 1986 he formed a commission composed of 12 cardinals and bishops chaired by cardinal Joseph Ratzinger (who later became Pope Benedict XVI) to prepare the first draft of the Catechism. The commission was assisted by a committee consisting of seven diocesan bishops, experts in theology and catechesis.

Reminiscing those days, Ratzinger said in 2011: "I must confess that even today it seems a miracle to me that this project [the Catechism of the Catholic Church] was ultimately successful."

Cardinal Georges Cottier claims he worked on the Catechism.

Promulgation 

The Catechism was promulgated by John Paul II on 11 October 1992, the 30th anniversary of the opening of the Second Vatican Council, with his apostolic constitution Fidei depositum (in English, The Deposit of Faith).

On 15 August 1997—the Solemnity of the Assumption of the Blessed Virgin Mary—John Paul II promulgated the Latin typical edition, with his apostolic letter, Laetamur magnopere.

Publication 
The CCC was published in the French language in 1992. In the United States, the English translation was published in 1994 and more than 250,000 copies had been pre-ordered before its release, with a note that it was "subject to revision according to the Latin typical edition (editio typica) when it is published."

The Latin typical edition, the official text of reference promulgated on 15 August 1997, amended the contents of the provisional French text at a few points. As a result, the earlier translations from the French into other languages (including English) had to be amended and re-published as "second editions".

Doctrinal value 
In the apostolic constitution Fidei depositum, John Paul II declared that the Catechism of the Catholic Church is "a valid and legitimate instrument for ecclesial communion and a sure norm for teaching the faith", and stressed that it "is not intended to replace the local catechisms duly approved by the ecclesiastical authorities, the diocesan Bishops and the Episcopal Conferences".

The Catechism states:

Contents 
The Catechism is a source on which to base other Catholic catechisms (e.g., YOUCAT or the United States Catholic Catechism for Adults) and other expositions of Catholic doctrine. As stated in the apostolic constitution Fidei depositum, with which its publication was ordered, it was given so "that it may be a sure and authentic reference text for teaching Catholic doctrine and particularly for preparing local catechisms."

The Catechism is arranged in four principal parts:
 The Profession of Faith (the Apostles' Creed)
 The Celebration of the Christian Mystery (the Sacred Liturgy, and especially the sacraments)
 Life in Christ (including the Ten Commandments)
 Christian Prayer (including the Lord's Prayer)

The section on Scripture in the Catechism covers the Patristic tradition of "spiritual exegesis" as further developed through the scholastic doctrine of the "four senses." The Catechism amplifies Dei verbum by specifying that the necessary spiritual interpretation should be sought through the four senses of Scripture.

The literal sense pertains to the meaning of the words themselves, including any figurative meanings. The spiritual senses pertain to the significance of the things (persons, places, objects or events) denoted by the words. Of the three spiritual senses, the allegorical sense is foundational. It relates persons, events, and institutions of earlier covenants to those of later covenants, and especially to the New Covenant. Building on the allegorical sense, the moral sense instructs in regard to action, and the anagogical sense points to man's final destiny. The teaching of the Catechism on Scripture has encouraged the pursuit of covenantal theology, an approach that employs the four senses to structure salvation history via the biblical covenants.

Paragraph 2267 (capital punishment) 

One of the changes in the 1997 update consisted of the inclusion of the position on the death penalty that is defended in John Paul II's encyclical Evangelium vitae of 1995.

The paragraph dealing with the death penalty (2267) was revised again by Pope Francis in 2018.

The text previously stated (1997):

The 2018 change to the Catechism reads:

Reception 

In 1992, cardinal Joseph Ratzinger (later Pope Benedict XVI) stated:

Ulf Ekman, former Charismatic pastor and the founder of Livets Ord, says that the Catechism is "the best book he has ever read".

Derived works 
The Compendium of the Catechism of the Catholic Church was published in 2005, and the first edition in English in 2006. It is a more concise and dialogic version of the Catechism. The text of the Compendium is available in fourteen languages on the Vatican website, which also gives the text of the Catechism itself in eleven languages.

Youcat is a 2011 publication aimed at helping youth understand the Catechism.

See also 

 Catechism of Saint Pius X
 Roman Catechism
 The Common Catechism
 Baltimore Catechism
 Catholic Catechist
 Catholic spirituality
 History of the Catholic Church since 1962
 Outline of Catholicism
 Pastoral care#Catholicism
 Timeline of the Catholic Church

Notes

References

Further reading

External links

Promulgations 
 Fidei depositum, the apostolic constitution promulgating the Catechism
 Laetamur magnopere, on the promulgation of the editio typica of the Catechism

Text of the Catechism 
 The Holy See – Archive – Catechism of the Catholic Church  (as of 29 May 2021)
 United States Conference of Catholic Bishops; English – Second edition (revised in accordance with the Latin editio typica)

Text of the Compendium 
 Compendium at Vatican/Holy See website

 
Pope John Paul II